Kalla is a neighbourhood in Asansol of Paschim Bardhaman district in the Indian state of West Bengal. It is governed by Asansol Municipal Corporation

Geography

Location

*For language details see Salanpur (community development block)#Language and religion

Urbanisation
In the 2011 census, 83.33% of the population of Asansol Sadar subdivision was urban and 16.67% was rural. In 2015, the municipal areas of Kulti, Raniganj and Jamuria were included within the jurisdiction of Asansol Municipal Corporation. Asansol Sadar subdivision has 26 (+1 partly) Census Towns.(partly presented in the map alongside; all places marked on the map are linked in the full-screen map).

Transport
ECL Central Hospital is located on Domohani Road and is near National Highway 19.

Healthcare
The Central Hospital of Eastern Coalfields at Kalla functions with 450 beds.

References

Neighbourhoods in Asansol